Salassa is a genus of moths in the family Saturniidae. It is the only genus in the subfamily Salassinae.

Species

References